The Kirtlands Warbler Wildlife Management Area is administered by the United States Fish and Wildlife Service, and is located in northern Lower Michigan.

The Kirtland's warbler is an endangered neotropical migratory bird. The breeding range of this species is primarily restricted to the northern Lower Peninsula of Michigan, and several locations in Michigan's Upper Peninsula and Wisconsin. This species winters on Bahamian islands in the Caribbean. Kirtland's Warbler Wildlife Management Area is located throughout eight counties in the northern Lower Peninsula of Michigan. Staff from Seney National Wildlife Refuge (Seney, Michigan) is responsible for land management at the refuge. Guided tours of parts of the refuge are available at the city of Grayling, around which the widespread parcels of this refuge are centralized.

References

 Refuge profile
 Refuge website

Protected areas of Clare County, Michigan
Protected areas of Crawford County, Michigan
Protected areas of Kalkaska County, Michigan
Protected areas of Montmorency County, Michigan
Protected areas of Ogemaw County, Michigan
Protected areas of Oscoda County, Michigan
Protected areas of Presque Isle County, Michigan
Protected areas of Roscommon County, Michigan
Wildlife management areas of Michigan
National Wildlife Refuges in Michigan